Sheen is a civil parish in the district of Staffordshire Moorlands, Staffordshire, England. It contains 37 listed buildings that are recorded in the National Heritage List for England.  Of these, four are at Grade II*, the middle of the three grades, and the others are at Grade II, the lowest grade.  Apart from the village of Sheen and smaller settlements, the parish is rural.  Most of the listed buildings are farmhouses and farm buildings, houses and associated structures, and cottages.  The other listed buildings are a church, a memorial in the churchyard, two crosses, a road bridge, the entrance to a former country house which has been demolished, a former school, and a milepost.


Key

Buildings

See also

Listed buildings in Longnor, Staffordshire
Listed buildings in Hartington Town Quarter
Listed buildings in Alstonefield
Listed buildings in Fawfieldhead
Listed buildings in Heathylee

References

Citations

Sources

Lists of listed buildings in Staffordshire